The Temple of Hephaestus or Hephaisteion (also "Hephesteum" or "Hephaesteum"; , , and formerly called in error the Theseion or "Theseum";), is a well-preserved Greek temple dedicated to Hephaestus; it remains standing largely intact today. It is a Doric peripteral temple, and is located at the north-west side of the Agora of Athens, on top of the Agoraios Kolonos hill. From the 7th century until 1834, it served as the Greek Orthodox church of Saint George Akamates. The building's condition has been maintained due to its history of varied use.

Name 

Hephaestus was the patron god of metal working, craftsmanship, and fire. There were numerous potters' workshops and metal-working shops in the vicinity of the temple, as befits the temple's honoree. Archaeological evidence suggests that there was no earlier building on the site except for a small sanctuary that was burned during the Second Persian invasion of Greece in 480 BC. The name Theseion or Temple of Theseus was attributed to the monument in modern times under the mistaken assumption that it housed the remains of the Athenian hero Theseus, brought back to the city from the island of Skyros by Kimon in 475 BC, but refuted after inscriptions from within the temple associated it firmly with Hephaestus.

Construction 
After the battle of Plataea, the Greeks swore never to rebuild their sanctuaries destroyed by the Persians during their invasion of Greece, but to leave them in ruins, as a perpetual reminder of the war. The Athenians directed their funds towards rebuilding their economy and strengthening their influence in the Delian League. When Pericles came to power, he envisioned a grand plan for transforming Athens into the centre of Greek power and culture. Construction started in 449 BC, and some scholars believe the building not to have been completed for some three decades, funds and workers having been redirected towards the Parthenon. The western frieze was completed between 445–440 BC, during which time the statue of Athena Hephaistia had been added to the shrine next to the cult statue of Hephaestus, while the eastern frieze, the western pediment and several changes in the building's interior are dated by these scholars to 435–430 BC, largely on stylistic grounds. It was only during the Peace of Nicias (421–415 BC) that the roof was completed and the cult images were installed.

Description 
Many architects have been suggested, but without firm evidence one refers simply to The Hephaisteion Master. The temple is built of marble from the nearby Mt. Penteli, excepting the bottom step of the krepis or platform. The architectural sculpture is in both Pentelic and Parian marble. The dimensions of the temple are 13.71 m north to south and 31.78 m east to west, with six columns on the short east and west sides and thirteen columns along the longer north and south sides (with each of the four corner columns being counted twice).

The building has a pronaos, a cella housing cult images at the centre of the structure, and an opisthodomos. The alignment of the antae of the pronaos with the third flank columns of the peristyle is a design element unique middle of the 5th century BC. There is also an inner Doric colonnade with five columns on the north and south side and three across the end (with the corner columns counting twice).

The decorative sculptures highlight the extent of mixture of the two styles in the construction of the temple. Both the pronaos and the opisthodomos are decorated with continuous Ionic friezes (instead of the more typical Doric triglyphs, supplementing the sculptures at the pediments and the metopes. In the pediments, the Birth of Athena (east) and the Return of Hephaistos to Olympos (west), and, as akroteria, the Nereids Thetis and Eurynome (west) accompanied by Nikai, the two ensembles are dated to ca. 430 and ca. 420–413 BC respectively. The frieze of the pronaos depicts a scene from the battle of Theseus with the Pallantides in the presence of gods while the frieze of the opisthodomos shows the battle of Centaurs and Lapiths.

Only 18 of the 68 metopes of the temple of Hephaestus were sculptured, concentrated especially on the east side of the temple; the rest were perhaps painted. The ten metopes on the east side depict the Labours of Heracles. The four easternmost metopes on the long north and south sides depict the Labours of Theseus.

According to Pausanias, the temple housed the bronze statues of Athena and Hephaestus. An inscription records payments between 421–415 BC for two bronze statues but it does not mention the sculptor. Tradition attributes the work to Alcamenes. Pausanias described the temple in the 2nd century:
Above the Kerameikos [in Athens] and the portico called the King's Portico is a temple of Hephaistos. I was not surprised that by it stands a statue of Athena, because I knew the story about Erikhthonios [i.e. the first king of Athens, a son of Hephaistos and Athena, birthed by Gaia the Earth].

In the 3rd century BC a small garden of pomegranate, myrtle, and laurel trees and shrubs was planted around the temple.

The sanctuary would have been closed during the persecution of pagans in the late Roman Empire.

Church 

Around AD 700, the temple was turned into a Christian church, dedicated to Saint George. Exactly when the temple was converted to a Christian church remains unknown. There are assumptions however that this possibly occurred in the 7th century.

Adding all kind of adjectives in the names of the churches, or the commemorated saints, is commonplace in Greek-orthodox tradition. The characterization as Saint George "Akamates" has been given a lot of explanations. One states that it probably derives from the name of Akamantas, the son of Theseus and Pheadra, later transformed to Akamatos, and later still to Akamates. Another is based on the literal sense of the word akamates (= flaneur, or loiterer), because during the Ottoman Era the temple was used only once a year, on the day of the feast of St. George. A third option is that the name is from Archbishop of Athens Michael Akominatos, who might have been the first to perform a Divine Liturgy in the church.

The last Divine Liturgy in the temple took place on 21 February 1833, during the celebrations for the arrival of Otto in Greece. In the presence of the Athenians and of many others the bishop Neophytos Talantiou (i.e. of Atalante) gave a speech.

19th century 
When Athens became the official capital of Greece in 1834, the publication of the relevant royal edict was made in this temple that was the place of the last public turnout of the Athenians. It was used as a burial place for non-Orthodox Europeans in the 19th century, among whom were many philhellenes who gave their lives in the cause of Greek War of Independence (1821–1830). Among those buried in the site was John Tweddel, a friend of Lord Elgin, while excavations also revealed a slab from the grave of George Watson with a Latin epitaph by Lord Byron. In 1834, the first King of Greece, Otto I, was officially welcomed there. Otto ordered the building to be used as a museum, in which capacity it remained until 1934, when it reverted to its status of an ancient monument and extensive archaeological research was allowed.

Works modeled on, or inspired by, the Temple of Hephaestus
 English garden (1795) Söderfors, Sweden
 Hagley Park, Worcestershire (1758) West Midlands, by James "Athenian" Stuart
 Arlington House, The Robert E. Lee Memorial (1802–17), Arlington National Cemetery, Virginia, US
 Monument to Sir Alexander Ball, (1810), Valletta, Malta
 Dundalk Courthouse (1813), Dundalk, Ireland
 Old Royal High School (1829), Edinburgh, Scotland
 McKim Free School (1833), Baltimore, Maryland, US
 Penshaw Monument (1844), Penshaw, Tyne and Wear, England
 Old Montgomery County Court House (1844–50), Dayton, Ohio, US
 Vermont State House (1857–59), Montpelier, Vermont, US

See also
 List of Ancient Greek temples
 Architecture of Ancient Greece
 Hexastyle
 List of Greco-Roman roofs

References

Further reading 
 Cruciani, C. 1998. I Modelli del Moderato. Naples.
 Dinsmoor, W. 1941. "Observations on the Hephaisteion", Hesperia Supplements V. Baltimore.
 
 
 

 "The Temple of Hephaestus" by Leo Masuda Architectonic Research Office

External links 

 High-resolution 360° Panorama of the Temple of Hephaestus | Art Atlas

5th-century BC religious buildings and structures
Temples in ancient Athens
Temple
Landmarks in Athens
Conversion of non-Christian religious buildings and structures into churches
Greek temples by deity